Íþróttafélagið Þór, commonly known as Þór Akureyri, simply Þór or Thór, is a multi-sport club in Akureyri, Iceland. It features departments in basketball, football, handball and taekwondo. Its main rivals is another sport club from Akureyri named KA. Þór and KA merged their handball clubs to form Akureyri Handboltafélag before the 2006–07 handball season in Iceland, resulting in some fans disowning the merged team.

Football

Trophies and achievements 
Icelandic Men's Football Cup:
Runner-up: 2011
Icelandic Division I (2):
2001, 2012
Icelandic Division II (2):
1975, 2000

Women's team

Since 1999, the women's football team has fielded a joint team with neighbouring club KA under the name Þór/KA in the top level league Úrvalsdeild. In 2006 the team finished 7th of 8 teams, 8th/9 in 2007, the reaching a good 4th/10 in 2008 and then bettering those results with 3rd/10 in 2009 and a second-place finish in 2010. As Iceland was in the top 8 leagues of UEFA, those second place was enough to qualify for the 2011–12 UEFA Women's Champions League. The team entered in the round of 32 but lost 14–2 on aggregate to German team Turbine Potsdam.

In 2010 the team also went to the semi-finals in the Icelandic cup, losing to the eventual winner Valur. In 1989 and 2013 they lost the cup final.

In 2012 Þór/KA finished first in the Úrvalsdeild and secured its first ever Icelandic championship.

On September 29, 2017, the club secured its second national championship by defeating FH, in the last game of the season, 2-0 with goals from Sandra Jessen and Sandra Stephany Mayor.

Trophies and achievements
Úrvalsdeild kvenna (1):
20121, 20171
Icelandic Women's Football Cup:
Runner-up: 19892, 20131
Icelandic Division I (2):
19832, 19991

 As Þór/KA
 As Þór Akureyri

Basketball

Men's basketball

Trophies and achievements
Division I (5):
1966–67, 1976–77, 1993–94, 2004–05, 2006–07, 2015–17
Division II (2):
1981–82, 2002–03

Women's basketball

Trophies and achievements
 Icelandic champions (3):
1969, 1971, 1976
 Icelandic Basketball Cup (1):
1975
 Division I (1):
2017

Handball

Women's handball

1. deild kvenna:
 Gold medal: 2018

References

External links
Official site 

 
1915 establishments in Iceland